Monique Adamczak and Stephanie Bengson were the defending champions, having won the event in 2012, but both players chose not to defend their titles the year after.

Junri Namigata and Erika Sema won the all-Japanese final, defeating Rika Fujiwara and Akiko Omae 7–5, 3–6, [10–7].

Seeds

Draw

References 
 Draw

Fukuoka International Women's Cup - Doubles
Fukuoka International Women's Cup